Dream Girl is a 2009 Indian Oriya film under Prasad Productions (P) Ltd., directed by Ashok Pati. The film stars Sabyasachi Mishra and Priya. This film is a remake of the Telugu film Bommarillu.

Synopsis 
The story is about a boy and his family. The story is about all the fathers, all the relations, the so-called generation gap, and especially about a dream girl, who has changed the boy's life. The story can be treated as a moral for each and every family in an entertaining way. 
When a baby is born and learns to walk, his father holds his hand and teaches him to walk. But what will be the situation if the father will not leave the hand even after 24 years? This is the situation of the boy in this story. He wants freedom in his life and wants to live by his own choice, but he always has to accept his father's decision as his one and only choice. He is bent on marrying a girl of his own choice, and how successful he became, perfectly depicted in this movie.

Cast
Sabyasachi Mishra - Sanju
Priya - Khusi
Mihir Das
Aparajita Mohanty
Bijaya Mohanty
Bobby Mishra
Pintu Nanda
Jairam Samal
Sofia alam
Debu Bose
Saheb Singh
Jina Samal
Jiban
Chunga
Roja
Florence
Chuni

Music 
The music of the film composed  by Prashant Padhi. The tracks from the film include:

References

External links 
   
 

2009 films
Odia remakes of Telugu films
2000s Odia-language films
Films directed by Ashok Pati